Mató de Pedralbes or mató de monja, is a typical dessert from Barcelona (in Catalonia, Spain) made with flavoured and sweetened milk. The dish is believed to have been created in the nineteenth century, by nuns of the convent in Barcelona's prestigious Pedralbes neighbourhood. It was intended as a richer, finer alternative to the older and popular crema catalana. Despite its name, this dessert bears no relationship to Catalan mató cheese, as mató ('curd' in Catalan) here refers to the shape and texture of this dessert taken out of the mould.

See also
Catalan cuisine
 List of custard desserts

References

Custard desserts
Catalan cuisine